The Trinity Altarpiece, also known as the Trinity Altar Panels, is a set of four paintings in oil on wood thought to have been commissioned for the Trinity College Kirk in Edinburgh, Scotland, in the late fifteenth century.

The work is attributed to the Flemish artist Hugo van der Goes and probably represents the inner and outer panels of the wings of a triptych. The presumed central panel is lost. The painting in the church was described as a "burd" on 17 May 1516 when John Stewart, Duke of Albany made an offering at the high altar on Trinity Sunday.

The work represents a rare example of religious art in Scotland to have survived the iconoclasm of the Scottish Reformation in 1560. The painting was taken to England at the Union of the Crowns and was part of the collection of Anne of Denmark wife of James VI and I. In 1618 she gave it to her son Prince Charles, who presented the painting to the Duke of Buckingham.

The panels are part of the British Royal Collection and are displayed at the Scottish National Gallery.

Description

The four panels depict the following subjects:

The Holy Trinity.
A praying cleric, thought to be the contemporary Provost of Trinity College Kirk, Edward Bonkil, accompanied by two angels playing an organ.
King James III of Scotland at prayer attended by Saint Andrew and a boy who may be the future King James IV.  The royal arms of Scotland hang from a wall.
Queen Margaret of Scotland at prayer attended by Saint George. Her royal arms decorate her lectern.

Edward Bonkil was a member of a wealthy Edinburgh merchant family with commercial connections in Bruges. He may have commissioned the altarpiece to strengthen ties of the Trinity Collegiate Church with Margaret of Denmark, and the imagery used may express her interests and personal iconography.

See also
Hours of James IV of Scotland
Portinari Altarpiece
Madonna in the Church

References

Scottish art
Paintings by Hugo van der Goes
Paintings in the National Galleries of Scotland
Triptychs
15th-century paintings
15th century in Scotland
Paintings depicting Jesus
Paintings depicting Michael (archangel)
Material culture of royal courts